Callahan House may refer to:

in the United States
(by state then city)
Matthew Callahan Log Cabin, Aspen, Colorado, listed on the National Register of Historic Places (NRHP) in Pitkin County 
T. M. Callahan House, Longmont, Colorado, listed on the NRHP in Boulder County 
J. W. Callahan House, Bainbridge, Georgia, listed on the NRHP in Decatur County
John Callahan House, Annapolis, Maryland, listed on the NRHP in Anne Arundel County
Pinkney-Callahan House, Annapolis, Maryland, listed on the NRHP in Anne Arundel County
Callahan House (Milford, Pennsylvania), listed on the NRHP in Pike County
John L. Callahan House, La Crosse, Wisconsin, listed on the NRHP in La Crosse County